In zoology, a folivore is a herbivore that specializes in eating leaves. Mature leaves contain a high proportion of hard-to-digest cellulose, less energy than other types of foods, and often toxic compounds. For this reason, folivorous animals tend to have long digestive tracts and slow metabolisms. Many enlist the help of symbiotic bacteria to release the nutrients in their diet. Additionally, as has been observed in folivorous primates, they exhibit a strong preference for  immature leaves, which tend to be easier to masticate, tend to be higher in energy and protein, and lower in fibre and poisons than more mature fibrous leaves.

Evolution 

Herbivory has evolved several times among different groups of animals. The first vertebrates were small fish that consumed protists and invertebrates. After these fish, the next group of vertebrates to evolve were piscivores, then insectivores, carnivores and finally herbivores. Since a complex set of adaptations was necessary for feeding on highly fibrous plant materials (structural modifications to the teeth, jaws, and digestive tract) and only a small proportion of extant tetrapods are obligate herbivores, it could be that early tetrapods made the transition to fully fledged herbivory by way of omnivory.

Folivory and flight

It has been observed that folivory is extremely rare among flying vertebrates.  Morton (1978) attributed this to the fact that leaves are heavy, slow to digest, and contain little energy relative to other foods. The hoatzin is an example of a flighted, folivorous bird. There are, however, many species of folivorous flying insects. 

Some bats are partially folivorous; their method of deriving nourishment from leaves, according to Lowry (1989), is to chew up the leaves, swallowing the sap and spitting out the remainder.

Arboreal folivores

Arboreal mammalian folivores, such as sloths, koalas, and some species of monkeys and lemurs, tend to be large and climb cautiously. Similarities in body shape and head- and tooth-structure between early hominoids and various families of arboreal folivores have been advanced as evidence that early hominoids were also folivorous.

Primates
Standard ecological theory predicts relatively large group sizes for folivorous primates, as large groups offer better collective defense against predators and they face little competition for food among each other. It has been observed that these animals nevertheless frequently live in small groups. Explanations offered for this apparent paradox include social factors such as increased incidence of infanticide in large groups.

Folivorous primates are relatively rare in the New World, the primary exception being howler monkeys. One explanation that has been offered is that fruiting and leafing occur simultaneously among New World plants. However a 2001 study found no evidence for simultaneous fruiting and leafing at most sites, apparently disproving this hypothesis.

Examples
Examples of folivorous animals include:

 Mammals: okapis, elephants, sloths, possums, giant pandas, koalas and various species of monkey, i.e. New World howlers and Old World colobines
 Birds: The hoatzin of the Amazon region and the kakapo of New Zealand
 Reptiles: iguanas
 Insects: various kinds of caterpillars, sawflies, beetles, leaf miners and Orthoptera
 Others: many land gastropod species (snails and slugs)

See also
 Consumer-resource systems
 Leaf miner, the folivorous strategy of many insects

References

External links

 wordquests.info

Herbivory
 
Animals by eating behaviors